Loup Township, Nebraska may refer to the following places:

Loup Township, Buffalo County, Nebraska
Loup Township, Custer County, Nebraska
Loup Township, Merrick County, Nebraska
Loup Township, Platte County, Nebraska

See also
Loup Ferry Township, Nance County, Nebraska
North Loup Township, Valley County, Nebraska

Nebraska township disambiguation pages